Longcochon is a commune in the Jura department in Bourgogne-Franche-Comté in eastern France.

Population

See also 
Communes of the Jura department

References 

Communes of Jura (department)